Joutjärvi church (Finnish: Joutjärven kirkko) is a Lutheran church in the Möysä district of Lahti, Finland. It serves the eastern inner city neighbourhoods, with a total parish population of 16,500.

Architecture
Designed in 1960-61 and completed in 1962, the building is the work of local architect Unto Ojonen, responsible for many Lahti buildings from the 1950-60s.

The church design is characterised by its steeply-pitched roof — something of an Ojonen signature feature — and slim belfry. The building complex integrates a parish hall and staff quarters. The exterior materials include yellow brick and slate, under a copper roof. The building was comprehensively refurbished in 2005–2006, and a new remote-operated church organ installed in 2014.

Art
The altar piece, titled Golgata ('Calvary'), and exterior relief Kymmenen neitsyttä, were created by sculptor Pentti Papinaho in 1963.

The liturgical textiles were designed by Helena Vaari in 1990–1995.

References

External links
 (in Finnish)

Lutheran churches in Finland
Modernist architecture in Finland
Churches completed in 1962
Lahti
Buildings and structures in Päijät-Häme